The 2013 Canadian Senior Curling Championships were held from March 16 to 24 at the Silver Fox Curling & Yacht Club in Summerside, Prince Edward Island. Summerside last hosted the Canadian Senior Championships in 2009. The winners of the championships will go on to represent Canada at the 2014 World Senior Curling Championships.

Men

Round-robin standings
Final round-robin standings

Playoffs

Semifinal
Saturday, March 23, 7:00 pm

Final
Sunday, March 24, 11:00 am

Women

Round-robin standings
Final round-robin standings

Playoffs

Semifinal
Saturday, March 23, 2:00 pm

Final
Sunday, March 24, 11:00 am

References

External links
 
 Host committee website

2013
2013 in Prince Edward Island
Sport in Summerside, Prince Edward Island
Curling competitions in Prince Edward Island
2013 in Canadian curling